George Ernest Kalmus, CBE, FRS (born 21 April 1935) is a noted British particle physicist.

Kalmus was born in Beočin, Yugoslavia, and  moved to Britain with his parents and his elder brother Peter Kalmus in 1939. His sister Elsa Joan Kalmus was born in 1945. The family became British Citizens in 1946.

Kalmus was Associate Director, 1986–94 and Director of Particle Physics, 1994–97 at the Rutherford Appleton Laboratory.

He was Visiting Professor, Physics and Astronomy Department, 1984–2000, University College London and has been a Fellow there since 1998.

Kalmus was elected a Fellow of the Royal Society in 1988 and made a CBE in 2000. He is currently an Honorary Scientist, Rutherford Appleton Laboratory

Education
Kalmus went to school first in Hampstead and then in Harpenden, Hertfordshire. From 1945 till 1953 he was at St Albans County Grammar School (later renamed Verulam School).  He received his BSc (1956) and PhD (1959) at University College London where he remained for a further three years as a Research Associate. He is now an Honorary Fellow of University College London.

Career and selected research
Kalmus undertook his PhD at University College London, working with the bubble chamber group.  The UCL group was working with the only heavy liquid chamber in the UK, the other groups being based on liquid hydrogen or helium chambers.  The aim of the group was to investigate ways of operating so-called "heavy liquids" at temperatures close to room temperature, and in particular to investigate the use of various high Z (atomic number) liquids as possible bubble chamber fluids.

After graduation, Kalmus continued at University College London, working on the design of a large bubble chamber which was built by the UCL group for the newly established National Institute for Research in Nuclear Science (NIRNS) – later to become the Rutherford Laboratory, and subsequently the Rutherford Appleton Laboratory (RAL).  The University College London group's contribution was to design a 1.4m heavy liquid bubble chamber, as one of the suite of tools to be used at the NIRNS 7GeV proton synchrotron.

Apart from this design work, the University College London group also established a collaboration with the heavy liquid bubble chamber group led by Professor Wilson Powell and Dr Bob Birge at the [Lawrence Radiation Laboratory] in Berkeley, California.  Kalmus participated in experiments to measure the branching ratio of the rare decay of the lambda hyperon into a proton, electron and anti neutrino used a stopping Kplus beam and from 230000 pictures obtained some 150 events of the above kind out of 190000 lambdas decaying to proton piminus.  Kalmus maintained a lasting interest in this field throughout his career.

In 1962, Kalmus joined the Powell-Birge group at the Lawrence Radiation Laboratory (LRL), initially working on a stopped K+ meson decay exposure in the 30 inch bubble chamber. Apart from a brief return to University College London circa 1964,   Kalmus remained at the Lawrence Radiation Laboratory until 1971, participating in a systematic investigation of Kminus proton scattering in the resonance region.

In 1970, Kalmus spent a year of sabbatical leave at CERN and there joined the Fidecaro group who were working on a pi+ proton scattering experiment on a polarised proton target using an electronic detector.

In 1971, Kalmus became the head of the bubble chamber group at the Rutherford Laboratory (subsequently the Rutherford Appleton Laboratory from 1979 onwards).  This was a large group, and Kalmus became responsible for leading its research direction.  At that time, The Rutherford Laboratory housed a 7 GeV weak focusing Proton Synchrotron, and an accelerator very similar to the Bevatron used at the Lawrence Radiation Laboratory in Berkeley. The CERN proton synchrotron, a 25 GeV strong focusing machine, was already in operation and it was clear that most experiments, including those at low energies using secondary beams, were better performed at CERN.  Kalmus organised the Rutherford Laboratory group into three areas, led by Colin Fisher, Wilbur Venus and by Kalmus himself.  All three research streams had very strong UK and International collaborations.  The groups were involved in a number of experiments using the CERN proton synchrotron (PS) and later the CERN Super Proton Synchrotron (SPS)(see NA26,  WA24, WA30, WA59 in particular in the List of Super Proton Synchrotron experiments).

Kalmus firmly believed in the concept that the Rutherford Appleton Laboratory, as the National Laboratory for Particle Physics, had as an important part of its mission the support of UK university groups. He encouraged collaboration by working with university groups on all his experiments.  Because RAL staff had no teaching responsibilities, they were more able to take on work within the collaborations that required longer periods at CERN or other overseas accelerators.

In 1978, based on the success of the track sensitive target neutrino programme spearheaded by Wilbur Venus, Kalmus proposed an experiment using this equipment, but instead of a neutrino beam, used a 70 GeV negative pion beam. The idea being that the primary interaction would take place in the hydrogen, and the reaction products would then traverse the surrounding Neon-Hydrogen mixture and electrons would be easily identified. This experiment was approved as a collaboration between the Rutherford Appleton Laboratory group and groups from Glasgow, Bologna, Saclay and Torino.  The results strengthened the evidence for single electrons apparently emerging from primary interaction vertices.

This was followed by an experiment he proposed which ran between 1979 and 1982 to measure the lifetimes of the charged and neutral charmed mesons using facilities at SLAC, as a collaboration with groups from Birmingham under Derek Colley, Imperial College under Peter Dornan, and groups from the US and Japan.  This was to be Kalmus’ last bubble chamber experiment.  The bubble chamber technique was increasingly having to be extended and enhanced in order to produce competitive results. By the mid 1980s all bubble chambers had been closed.  Kalmus was nevertheless a significant practitioner for much of the thirty-year period when the bubble chamber was the dominant technique in the field.

Kalmus’ group then turned to the Large Electron–Positron Collider (LEP) being constructed at CERN.  The three sub groups of the bubble chamber group re coalesced and joined with groups from Oxford, and later Liverpool, the newly forming international collaboration, which eventually became DELPHI.  DELPHI – standing for DEtector with Lepton, Photon and Hadron Identification – was one of four large detectors used at LEP.

In 1986, Kalmus was asked to become the Director of Particle Physics and Head of the Particle Physics Department at the Rutherford Appleton Laboratory, remaining in that position and capacity until 1997.  This work took him away from much of the direct research participation, but established Kalmus as a highly influential figure nationally and internationally.

He also subsequently became the chairman of the DELPHI collaboration board and deputy spokesperson.  The UK responsibility within the DELPHI project was in three technical areas: the outer detector, primarily Liverpool; the barrel muon chambers, primarily Oxford; and the data acquisition system, primarily RAL. However, the UK groups were centrally funded, and RAL with its relatively large engineering and design capabilities participated in all three activities when need arose.  The Rutherford Appleton Laboratory also designed and constructed the large super conducting solenoid which surrounded the DELPHI detector.

In 1998, Kalmus took sabbatical leave from the Rutherford Appleton Laboratory and joined the NA48 Experiment at CERN whose prime purpose was to measure "direct" CP violation in Kzero decays.  Since RAL was not a formal participant in the experiment, Kalmus joined the group from Cambridge led by Dr Tom White, who together with a small group from Edinburgh were the British members of the collaboration.

Kalmus formally retired from the Rutherford Appleton Laboratory in 2000, but remains an Honorary Scientist there.

Subsequent to his retirement, he joined the ZEPLIN 3 collaboration (RAL, Imperial College, Edinburgh, and Russian and Portuguese groups) searching for 'Dark Matter' particles, using a liquid xenon detector located in the Boulby Underground Laboratory in Yorkshire.

Publications

Kalmus has published numerous articles on experimental particle physics.  A listing of many of Kalmus' works can be found in 'INSPIRE' Particle Physics Database and the Science and Technology Facilities Council ePublication Archive.

Positions
 1959-1962 – Research Associate at University College London.  
 1962-1963 – Research Associate at Lawrence Radiation Laboratory(LRL) University of California, Berkeley.            
 1963-1964 – Lecturer in Physics Department at University College London. 
 1964-1967 – Research Associate at Lawrence Radiation Laboratory, University of California, Berkeley            
 1967-1971 – Senior Physicist at Lawrence Radiation Laboratory University of California. 
 1970-1971 – Sabbatical leave at CERN as visiting scientist 
 1972-1986 – Group Leader, Bubble Chamber Group and DELPHI Group, Rutherford Appleton Laboratory (RAL), England 
 1984      – Visiting Professor, Physics Department at University College London.    
 1986-1997 – Director, Particle Physics and Head of Particle Physics Department. Rutherford Appleton Laboratory.            
 1998-2000 – Senior Scientist, Rutherford Appleton Laboratory, on sabbatical leave at CERN            
 2000      – Honorary Scientist, Rutherford Appleton Laboratory

Professional and science organisations
Kalmus has served on and contributed to a considerable number of professional and science organisations throughout his career. These have included over a decade as the Director and Head of Particle Physics Department of the Rutherford Appleton Laboratory.  Kalmus has also been an active member of the Lawrence Radiation Laboratory and of CERN and University College London.

He has also been involved the Royal Society and with the American Physical Society and the Institute of Physics.

Apart from his duties as Director of Particle Physics at Rutherford Appleton Laboratory, Kalmus has served on a number of international committees.  These include:

 Member of the CERN Track Chamber Committee
 Chairman of the BEBC user group at CERN
 Member of the CERN Super Proton Synchrotron Committee
 Member of the Forschungszentrum Karlsruhe Fundamental Physics Advisory Committee
 Chairman of the European High Energy Physics Computing Coordinating Committee
 Member of the Advisory Committee on TRIUMF (2000-2005)
 Member of the CERN Scientific Policy Committee (1990-1996)
 Chairman of the CERN Scientific Policy Committee (1999-2001)
 Member of the DOE/NSF HEPAP Long Range Planning Group (2001)
 Chairman of the ECFA Group on Organisational Matters for an International Linear Collider (2003)
 Member of the ICFA International Technology Review Panel for an International Linear Collider (2004)

Honours and awards
 1960 – Fellow of the Physical Society (Later the Institute of Physics)
 1988 – Fellow of the American Physical Society
 1988 – Fellow of the Royal Society
 1998 – Fellow of University College London
 2000 – CBE for services to international particle physics research
 2002 – Institute of Physics Glazebrook Medal and Prize for leadership and promotion of particle physics in the UK and internationally

Personal life
Kalmus' father, Hans Kalmus, was a well-known biologist who worked at University College, London from 1939, officially retiring as Professor in 1973 but continuing there until his death in 1988 at the age of 82.

His brother, Peter Kalmus, is another noted British particle physicist. A press release from the Particle Physics and Astronomy Research Council (PPARC) in 2002 commented that "A particle physicist in the family is a rare occurrence. That there should be two and both be leaders of the field is even more unusual, yet Professors Peter and George Kalmus have achieved this."

Kalmus has three daughters.

He currently resides in Abingdon with his wife, Ann Christine (née Harland) Kalmus.

References

External links
Scientific publications of George Kalmus on INSPIRE-HEP

1935 births
British Jews
Fellows of the Royal Society
Jewish scientists
Living people
Particle physicists
Academics of University College London
Alumni of University College London
British physicists
People associated with CERN